Davidson House is a historic home located near Troutman, Iredell County, North Carolina.  The original section was built about 1805, and enlarged and remodeled in the Federal period about 1830.  It is a -story, two bay by two bay, log dwelling sheathed in weatherboard.  It has a hall and parlor plan, front shed porch, rear shed rooms and porch, and a single should brick chimney.  Also on the property is a contributing two-story three-bay wide, half-dovetail log barn.

It was added to the National Register of Historic Places in 1980.

References

Houses on the National Register of Historic Places in North Carolina
Federal architecture in North Carolina
Houses completed in 1805
Houses in Iredell County, North Carolina
National Register of Historic Places in Iredell County, North Carolina
1805 establishments in North Carolina